Events in the year 1491 in Japan.

Incumbents
Monarch: Go-Tsuchimikado

Births
date unknown - Azai Sukemasa (d. 1546), daimyō

 
 
Japan
Years of the 15th century in Japan